The 1920 Svenska Mästerskapet was the 25th season of Svenska Mästerskapet, the football cup to determine the Swedish champions. Djurgårdens IF won the tournament by defeating IK Sleipner in the final with a 1–0 score.

Qualifying rounds

First qualifying round

|-
|colspan=3 align=center|Replays

|}

Second qualifying round

|-
|colspan=3 align=center|Replays

|}

Third qualifying round

|-
|colspan=3 align=center|Replays

|}

Main tournament

Preliminary round

|-
|colspan=3 align=center|Replays

|}

Quarter-finals

|-
|colspan=3 align=center|Replays

|}

Semi-finals

|}

Final

References 

Print

1920
Svenska
Mas